James Henry Whitecotton (June 9, 1854 – September 11, 1944) was an American politician from who served in the Missouri Senate and earlier in the Missouri House of Representatives as Speaker of the House.

References

1854 births
1944 deaths
Democratic Party Missouri state senators
Speakers of the Missouri House of Representatives
Democratic Party members of the Missouri House of Representatives
20th-century American politicians